The 2015 Heart of Dallas Bowl was a post-season American college football bowl game played on December 26, 2015 at the Cotton Bowl at Fair Park in Dallas, Texas. The sixth edition of the Heart of Dallas Bowl featured the Washington Huskies of the Pac-12 Conference against the Southern Miss Golden Eagles of Conference USA. It began at 1:20 p.m. CST and aired on ESPN.  It was one of the 2015–16 bowl games that concluded the 2015 FBS football season.  Sponsored by chicken fast food restaurant Zaxby's, the game was officially known as the Zaxby's Heart of Dallas Bowl. Washington Huskies defeated the University of Southern Mississippi 44–31.

Teams
The game featured the Washington Huskies against the Southern Miss Golden Eagles.

Washington Huskies

After finishing their regular season 6–6, bowl director Brant Ringler extended an invitation for the Huskies to play in the game, which they accepted.

Southern Miss Golden Eagles

After finishing their season 9–4, Olivas extended an invitation for the Golden Eagles to play in the game, which they accepted as well.

Game summary

Scoring summary

Source:

Statistics

References

External links
 Game summary at ESPN

Heart of Dallas Bowl
First Responder Bowl
Washington Huskies football bowl games
Southern Miss Golden Eagles football bowl games
Heart of Dallas Bowl
December 2015 sports events in the United States
Heart of Dallas Bowl, 2015
Heart of Dallas Bowl